Jiggy Smaha is a former American football linebacker who played one season with the BC Lions of the Canadian Football League. He was drafted by the Cleveland Browns in the 14th round of the 1969 NFL Draft. He played college football at the University of Georgia. Smaha was also a member of the Dallas Cowboys, Oakland Raiders and Jacksonville Sharks but did not see any playing time.

References

External links
Just Sports Stats

Living people
Year of birth missing (living people)
American football linebackers
Canadian football linebackers
American players of Canadian football
Georgia Bulldogs football players
BC Lions players
Cleveland Browns players